Windwalker may refer to:
The Wind-Walker, an epithet for Ithaqua, in the Cthulhu mythos stories
Windwalker (film), a 1981 film starring Trevor Howard and Nick Ramus
Windwalker (band), a band from Vancouver, British Columbia
Windwalker (video game), a sequel to the RPG adventure game, Moebius: The Orb of Celestial Harmony, published by Origin Systems
 Windwalker, a 2003 fantasy novel by Elaine Cunningham
Windwalkers, nickname the former United States Marine Helicopter Training Squadron 301

See also
 Windtalkers, a 2002 American war film